Vitaly Valentinovich Milonov (born 23 January 1974) is a Russian politician, deputy of the State Duma of the Russian Federation since 2016. A member of United Russia, he has served as a Member of the State Duma for Saint Petersburg South since 2016. As a legislator, he is known for his opposition to LGBT rights in Russia. From 2007 to 2016, he was a Member of the Legislative Assembly of Saint Petersburg.

Biography

After studying Local Governance Administration in the North-West Academy of Public Administration in St. Petersburg, from which he graduated in 2006, he completed a correspondence course at the Saint Tikhon's Orthodox University in Moscow.

His political career began in 1991 when he joined the Free Democratic Party of Russia. From 1994 to 1995, he was an assistant to Vitaly Viktorovich Savitsky, chairman in the 1990s of the existing Christian Democratic Union of Russia (CDU). During this time Milonov was also chairman of the "Young Christian Democrats", a political youth branch of the CDU Russia. Later, he became a friend of Russian politician Galina Starovoitova who supported him politically as well. After the murder of Starovoitova, he turned away from politics. In 2004 he began again his political career at the municipal level as a council member of the community "Dachnoe", in 2005 as head of the city administration of Krasnenkaya Rechka Municipal Okrug in St. Petersburg. In 2007 he successfully ran for elections to the Legislative Assembly of Saint Petersburg and was in his first term Chairman of the Committee for the establishment of the government, local government, and territorial management structure. In 2009, he moved to the Chair of the Committee for legislation. In 2011 he was re-elected as an MLA. While in the legislature, Milonov was the principal sponsor of legislation criminalising "homosexual propaganda directed toward minors". In 2016 elections, he was elected to the State Duma representing United Russia.

Controversy

Homosexuality
In 2013, Milonov stated that gay athletes could be subject to arrest at the 2014 Winter Olympics, if promoting homosexuality to minors. He stated, "If a law has been approved by the federal legislature and signed by the president, then the government has no right to suspend it. It doesn't have the authority." Milonov also protested the Side by Side LGBT film festival in November 2013.

On October 30, 2014, Milonov spoke out about Apple CEO Tim Cook's homosexuality and said on the FlashNord website: “What could he bring us? The Ebola virus, AIDS, gonorrhea? They all have unseemly ties over there.”

Milonov was interviewed in the 2014 documentary film Campaign of Hate: Russia and Gay Propaganda.

In the BBC documentary Reggie Yates' Extreme, Russia - Gay and Under Attack, when asked if he thought homosexuals were dangerous, Milonov said, "A piece of shit is not dangerous, but it's quite unpleasant to see on the streets. Homosexuality is disgusting. Homophobia is beautiful and natural."

Antisemitism
On 19 March 2014, Milonov reportedly made anti-Semitic statements to the St. Petersburg Legislative Council. According to the svodka.net news website, Milonov stated that Jews "vilify any saint, it is in their tradition of 2,000 years, beginning with the appeals to crucify the Saviour, ending with accusations of anti-Semitism against St. John of Kronstadt." Regarding allegations that St. John of Kronstadt, a 19th-century religious leader, was a supporter of the Black Hundred, Milonov argued that this allegation was based on “complete lies, a modern neo-liberal fable with a sulfuric, deep history of Satanism."

Christian fundamentalism 
Milonov was recognized as an extremist after posting a picture in which he appeared with a gun and a T-shirt with extremist writings Orthodoxy or death. He refused to pay a fine for it and went unpunished due to parliamentary immunity.

Other controversies
In 2015, Milonov reported that he proposed to the Minister of Internal Affairs to introduce compulsory driving license for bicycle riders, since they behave improperly on the road.

On 15 June 2016, Milonov sent an official request to the Prime Minister Dmitry Medvedev, proposing to use the historic name Constantinople for Istanbul in all Russian media and maps.

In March 2018, Milonov denounced the British Government's claim that the Russian Government was "highly likely" responsible for the poisoning of Sergei and Yulia Skripal. Comparing the British Prime Minister Theresa May to Adolf Hitler, Milonov claimed that Britain was responsible for the attack and was pushing a "fantasy" for blaming Russia.

On February 24, 2022, at the beginning of Russian invasion of Ukraine, BBC News radio in the USA broadcast an expletive-laced interview with Milonov during which Milonov claimed that the UK, the European Union, and the United States have provoked the invasion. He further claimed that Ukraine's president lacks public support and that Russia has valid rights to keep Ukraine under its influence. Following the mobilization in Russia in September 2022, Milonov was mobilized and sent to the front in Donbas with the rank of junior sergeant to help with an anti-tank artillery battery.

Political views

Abortion 
Milonov is a radical opponent of abortion. In 2012 he took the initiative to endow the embryo with civil rights. The bill was quickly rejected.

Immigration 
Milonov planned to increase income tax to 30% for enterprises and organizations that employ at least 30% of migrant workers and to save a suitable draft resolution on amendments to the Tax Code of Russia to the Legislative Assembly of St. Petersburg.

In 2022, he offered to segregate children of migrants and ban them from Russian schools.

Foreign policy 
As the main supporter of the Armenian lobby among Russian politics, he called himself “the real friend of Armenia”. He supported Armenia in the Karabakh war, as well as the Assad regime and Greece in the Cyprus conflict. After the ending of the 2020 Karabakh war, Milonov called the Turkish president Erdoğan an Islamic terrorist and a supporter of ISIS.

Milonov is anti-Turkish. He declared that Constantinople would be "liberated again" and called for sanctions against Turkey.

Personal life
Milonov was married to Eva Liburkina between 2008 and 2011, but is now divorced. They raised three children —daughter Marfa, son Nikolay and a foster-son. In 1991 he joined the Baptist church. Later, in 1998, he converted to the Russian Orthodox Church. In 2012, Milonov courted controversy by wearing a shirt bearing the slogan "Orthodoxy or death!".

Milonov is also known to be a board games player. He frequently plays the videogame Hearthstone by Blizzard Entertainment.

References

External links
 
 http://www.bbc.co.uk/programmes/p01jtqcb
 

United Russia politicians
1974 births
Russian Orthodox Christians from Russia
Converts to Eastern Orthodoxy from Protestantism
Former Baptists
Politicians from Saint Petersburg
Living people
21st-century Russian politicians
Seventh convocation members of the State Duma (Russian Federation)
Eighth convocation members of the State Duma (Russian Federation)
Anti-LGBT sentiment
Antisemitism in Russia
Anti-Ukrainian sentiment in Russia
Anti-Turkish sentiment
Saint Tikhon's Orthodox University alumni
Russian Presidential Academy of National Economy and Public Administration alumni
Members of Legislative Assembly of Saint Petersburg